Post Swiss Team was a Swiss cycling team that existed from 1996 to 2001. The team was known as PMU Romand–Bepsa in 1996.

References

Defunct cycling teams based in Switzerland
Cycling teams based in Switzerland
Cycling teams established in 1996
Cycling teams disestablished in 2001